Balclutha is a town in  South Otago, lying towards the end of the Clutha River, on the east coast of the South Island of New Zealand. It is about halfway between Dunedin and Gore on the Main South Line railway, State Highway 1 and the Southern Scenic Route.

The Clutha District Council is based in Balclutha.

The major service centre for the fertile farming region around the lower reaches of the Clutha River, it is also the nearest large town to the Catlins, a scenic region of native forest, wildlife, and rugged coastline.

History

Known locally as "Clutha", Balclutha's name – and that of the river on which it stands – reflects the Scottish origin of the town's settlement. The name comes from Scottish Gaelic and would be spelt Baile Chluaidh in that language; this translates into English as "Town on the Clyde".

James McNeil from Bonn Hill, Dumbartonshire, Scotland, who is regarded as the town's founding father, arrived in 1853, via Port Chalmers in 1849. His farm was on the site of the present town, where he and the Provincial Government established a ferry service across the Clutha in 1857; as a result the town was initially called Clutha Ferry.

The Māori name for the area is Iwikatea, literally "Bleached bones" (a local Māori tribal battle in 1750 left the decomposing bodies of the defeated, their bones whitened in the sun).

Demographics 

Balclutha had a population of 4,110 at the 2018 New Zealand census, an increase of 123 people (3.1%) since the 2013 census, and a decrease of 27 people (−0.7%) since the 2006 census. There were 1,725 households. There were 2,013 males and 2,100 females, giving a sex ratio of 0.96 males per female, with 678 people (16.5%) aged under 15 years, 741 (18.0%) aged 15 to 29, 1,734 (42.2%) aged 30 to 64, and 960 (23.4%) aged 65 or older.

Ethnicities were 86.7% European/Pākehā, 11.5% Māori, 3.4% Pacific peoples, 5.0% Asian, and 1.3% other ethnicities (totals add to more than 100% since people could identify with multiple ethnicities).

The proportion of people born overseas was 12.6%, compared with 27.1% nationally.

Although some people objected to giving their religion, 52.1% had no religion, 36.3% were Christian, 0.7% were Hindu, 1.1% were Muslim, 0.6% were Buddhist and 1.6% had other religions.

Of those at least 15 years old, 339 (9.9%) people had a bachelor or higher degree, and 1,047 (30.5%) people had no formal qualifications. 354 people (10.3%) earned over $70,000 compared to 17.2% nationally. The employment status of those at least 15 was that 1,710 (49.8%) people were employed full-time, 447 (13.0%) were part-time, and 96 (2.8%) were unemployed.

Landmarks
The Clutha River flows through the town. It is the largest river in New Zealand by volume of water, and the country's second longest after the Waikato. It provides the town with various recreational facilities, including fishing (brown trout), water skiing and power boating. Immediately to the south of the town it splits into two distributaries, the Matau and the Koau, the latter of which skirts the southern edge of the town.

The most prominent structure in the town is the concrete Balclutha Road Bridge across the Clutha, which was built in 1935. The original 1868 wooden bridge was washed away on 14 October 1878. Rebuilt in 1881, it was later considered unsuitable for motor vehicles.

The South Island Main Trunk Railway crosses the river some 800 metres downstream, near the junction where the Clutha River divides into the southern branch, known as the Kaoru (pied shag), and the northern the Matau (derived from Mata Au, the Maori name for the Clutha).

Most of Balclutha township lies on 'the flat' land which lies within a wide loop in the river to the south of the road bridge, but North Balclutha is on the hill to the north of the bridge and Rosebank on the hill to the south.

There are several natural features in and near Balclutha. Nearby at Benhar / Kaitangata is Lake Tuakitoto, and Matai Falls, a natural waterfall and scenic feature is in the Catlins. The yellow-eyed penguin comes ashore for breeding in the Balclutha area at the edge of the Catlins, and The Nuggets are located at nearby Kaka Point.

Education

Primary schools

Clutha Valley Primary is an educational primary school for year 1 to 8 students.

Secondary schools

Tertiary education

There is one tertiary education facility, Telford, a campus of the Southern Institute of Technology.

Notable people

 Alister Abernethy, politician
 Ronald Algie, politician, educated in Balclutha
 John Barr, poet
 Aubrey Begg, politician
 Tony Brown, All Black rugby union player
 Morgan Endicott-Davies, judoka
 Tony Ensor, rugby union player international sevens player
 Matt Faddes, rugby union player and international sevens player
 Phillipa Finch, netball player
 Aaron Gale, international cricketer
 Paul Grant, rugby union player and international rugby sevens player
 Hone Kouka, playwright
 Robbie Johnston, Olympic long-distance runner
 Ian Murray Mackerras, zoologist
 Clive Matthewson, politician
 Jan Mortimer, international draughts player
 Rachel Pullar, women's international cricketer
 Barbara Tilden, international hockey player
 Sarah Tsukigawa, women's international cricketer
 Rob Webster, virologist
 Debbie White, international netball player
  Charles Willocks, rugby union player and All Black
 Jared Wrennall, band member for Steriogram
 Edward (Ted) Bullmore, surrealist artist

Notes

References
 Bette Flagler. 2005. Adventure guide: New Zealand, Hunter Publishing, Inc, 800 pages

External links

 
Populated places in Otago
Southern Scenic Route
Clutha River
Clutha District